Kisecset is a village in Nógrád county, Hungary.

External links 
 Street map 
 www.kisecsetinfo.hu 

Populated places in Nógrád County